Parinari rigida is a tree in the family Chrysobalanaceae. The specific epithet  is from the Latin meaning "stiff", referring to the leaves.

Description
The bark is smooth.

Distribution and habitat
Parinari rigida grows naturally in Sumatra, Peninsular Malaysia and Borneo. Its habitat is heath and swamp forests from sea-level to  altitude.

References

rigida
Trees of Sumatra
Trees of Peninsular Malaysia
Trees of Borneo
Plants described in 1965